Frank Boynton may refer to:
Frank Ellis Boynton (1859–1942), American botanist
Frank Boynton (footballer) (1887–1946), player in the Australian Football League
Frank Boynton (golfer) (born 1936), American golfer